Michael Hanna may refer to:
 Mike Hanna (born 1953), United States congressman
 Michael Hanna (sportsman) (born 1926), cricketer and rugby union player
 Michael G. Hanna (born 1963), professor of neurology
 Michael Hanna (judge), Irish judge

See also
 Michael Hannan (disambiguation)